Makoto Ishikawa  (born October 12, 1974) is a Japanese mixed martial artist. He competed in the Featherweight and Lightweight divisions.

Mixed martial arts record

|-
| Loss
| align=center| 11-10-1
| Hidehiko Hasegawa
| Decision (unanimous)
| Deep: 40 Impact
| 
| align=center| 2
| align=center| 5:00
| Tokyo, Japan
| 
|-
| Loss
| align=center| 11-9-1
| Yoshihiro Tomioka
| KO (punches)
| Deep: 31 Impact
| 
| align=center| 1
| align=center| 3:12
| Tokyo, Japan
| 
|-
| Loss
| align=center| 11-8-1
| Takeshi Inoue
| Decision (unanimous)
| Shooto: The Victory of the Truth
| 
| align=center| 3
| align=center| 5:00
| Tokyo, Japan
| 
|-
| Loss
| align=center| 11-7-1
| Katsuya Toida
| Submission (rear naked choke)
| Shooto 2005: 7/30 in Korakuen Hall
| 
| align=center| 2
| align=center| 4:09
| Tokyo, Japan
| 
|-
| Loss
| align=center| 11-6-1
| Rumina Sato
| Decision (unanimous)
| Shooto: 3/11 in Korakuen Hall
| 
| align=center| 3
| align=center| 5:00
| Tokyo, Japan
| 
|-
| Win
| align=center| 11-5-1
| Hiroyuki Abe
| TKO (cut)
| Shooto: Year End Show 2004
| 
| align=center| 3
| align=center| 0:40
| Tokyo, Japan
| 
|-
| Win
| align=center| 10-5-1
| Antoine Skinner
| Decision (unanimous)
| SB 35: SuperBrawl 35
| 
| align=center| 3
| align=center| 5:00
| Honolulu, Hawaii, United States
| 
|-
| Win
| align=center| 9-5-1
| Tetsuo Katsuta
| Decision (unanimous)
| Shooto 2004: 1/24 in Korakuen Hall
| 
| align=center| 3
| align=center| 5:00
| Tokyo, Japan
| 
|-
| Draw
| align=center| 8-5-1
| Tetsuo Katsuta
| Technical Draw
| Shooto: Wanna Shooto 2003
| 
| align=center| 1
| align=center| 1:22
| Tokyo, Japan
| 
|-
| Loss
| align=center| 8-5
| Hideki Kadowaki
| Decision (unanimous)
| Shooto: 5/4 in Korakuen Hall
| 
| align=center| 3
| align=center| 5:00
| Tokyo, Japan
| 
|-
| Win
| align=center| 8-4
| Eiji Murayama
| Decision (unanimous)
| Shooto: Treasure Hunt 10
| 
| align=center| 2
| align=center| 5:00
| Yokohama, Kanagawa, Japan
| 
|-
| Win
| align=center| 7-4
| Yohei Nanbu
| Decision (majority)
| Shooto: Treasure Hunt 5
| 
| align=center| 2
| align=center| 5:00
| Tokyo, Japan
| 
|-
| Win
| align=center| 6-4
| David Velasquez
| Submission (armbar)
| Shogun 1: Shogun 1
| 
| align=center| 1
| align=center| 4:36
| Honolulu, Hawaii, United States
| 
|-
| Loss
| align=center| 5-4
| Kazuya Abe
| KO (punch)
| Shooto: To The Top 8
| 
| align=center| 1
| align=center| 0:29
| Tokyo, Japan
| 
|-
| Win
| align=center| 5-3
| Koichi Tanaka
| Decision (unanimous)
| Shooto: Gig East 3
| 
| align=center| 2
| align=center| 5:00
| Tokyo, Japan
| 
|-
| Win
| align=center| 4-3
| Eugene Hynson
| Submission (armbar)
| Shooto: Wanna Shooto 2001
| 
| align=center| 2
| align=center| 4:42
| Setagaya, Tokyo, Japan
| 
|-
| Loss
| align=center| 3-3
| Koji Takeuchi
| Decision (majority)
| Shooto: R.E.A.D. 5
| 
| align=center| 2
| align=center| 5:00
| Tokyo, Japan
| 
|-
| Win
| align=center| 3-2
| Kazumichi Takada
| Decision (unanimous)
| Shooto: R.E.A.D. 4
| 
| align=center| 2
| align=center| 5:00
| Setagaya, Tokyo, Japan
| 
|-
| Win
| align=center| 2-2
| Jinzaburo Yonezawa
| Decision (unanimous)
| Shooto: R.E.A.D. 1
| 
| align=center| 2
| align=center| 5:00
| Tokyo, Japan
| 
|-
| Loss
| align=center| 1-2
| Dokonjonosuke Mishima
| Decision (unanimous)
| Shooto: Renaxis 3
| 
| align=center| 2
| align=center| 5:00
| Setagaya, Tokyo, Japan
| 
|-
| Loss
| align=center| 1-1
| Satoshi Fujisaki
| Decision (unanimous)
| Shooto: Shooter's Passion
| 
| align=center| 2
| align=center| 5:00
| Setagaya, Tokyo, Japan
| 
|-
| Win
| align=center| 1-0
| Mitsuo Matsumoto
| Decision (unanimous)
| Shooto: Devilock Fighters
| 
| align=center| 2
| align=center| 5:00
| Tokyo, Japan
|

See also
List of male mixed martial artists

References

1974 births
Japanese male mixed martial artists
Featherweight mixed martial artists
Lightweight mixed martial artists
Living people